Paraleprodera carolina is a species of beetle in the family Cerambycidae. It was described by Léon Fairmaire in 1900. It is known from China.

References

Lamiini
Beetles described in 1900